Henry James Oakes (23 June 1796 – 9 September 1875) was an English first-class cricketer who played for Cambridge University in one match in 1819, totalling 6 runs with a highest score of 5 not out.

Oakes' family lived at Nowton Court, Nowton, Suffolk, near Bury St Edmunds. He was educated at Reading School, Bury St Edmunds Grammar School and Emmanuel College, Cambridge. He inherited Nowton Court in 1837 and became lord of the manor of Nowton. He was head of his family's bank, Oakes, Bevan & Co. (later Oakes, Bevan, Tollemache & Co., taken over in 1900 by Capital and Counties Bank, which was acquired by Lloyds Bank in 1918). He was mayor of Bury St Edmunds in 1844 and High Sheriff of Suffolk in 1847.

References

Bibliography

External links
Portrait of Henry James Oakes, Art UK

English cricketers
English cricketers of 1787 to 1825
Cambridge University cricketers
1796 births
1875 deaths
People educated at King Edward VI School, Bury St Edmunds
Alumni of Emmanuel College, Cambridge
English bankers
High Sheriffs of Suffolk
Sportspeople from Bury St Edmunds
19th-century English businesspeople